The Lex van Rossen Award was an award aiming to encourage young European music photographers. Since 2008 the award was presented on an annual basis during the European music conference and showcase festival Eurosonic Noorderslag in the Dutch city of Groningen. The Award was named after pop photographer Lex van Rossen, who died on February 24, 2007, at the age of 57. The Award included a gift of 2500 euro's. The Lex van Rossen Award was initiated by Popview and ceased to exist in 2011.

Winners
2008 - Annie Hoogendoorn (NL)
2009 - Tom Verbruggen (BE)
2010 - Graham Smith (IE)
2011 - Dirk Wolf (NL)

See also

 List of European art awards

References

External links
 Website Popview
 Website Eurosonic Noorderslag

Awards established in 2003
Awards disestablished in 2011
Photography awards
Dutch art awards